The Red Oak Public Library is located in Red Oak, Iowa, United States. Andrew Carnegie accepted the city's application for a grant for $12,500 on November 27, 1906. The Chicago architectural firm of Patton & Miller designed the Tudor Revival structure. It was dedicated on October 8, 1909.

The two-story building features a side-gable plan, and rustic brick-and-half-timbered style.  It is somewhat unusual in that its main entrance was at grade.  The corners are buttresses that rise from the base in a concave curve and disappear into the walls before they emerge above the eaves as parapets. A two-story addition was built onto the rear of the building in 1924 to house a new book stack, and another two-story addition was built on the south side to house reading rooms.  Both additions complement the structure's original design.  The building was individually listed on the National Register of Historic Places in 1983. In 2016 it was included as a contributing property in the Red Oak Downtown Historic District.

References

Library buildings completed in 1909
Carnegie libraries in Iowa
Public libraries in Iowa
Tudor Revival architecture in Iowa
Red Oak, Iowa
Buildings and structures in Montgomery County, Iowa
National Register of Historic Places in Montgomery County, Iowa
Libraries on the National Register of Historic Places in Iowa
Individually listed contributing properties to historic districts on the National Register in Iowa